The 2015–16 Copa del Rey was the 6th staging of the Copa del Rey de Futsal. The competition started on 22 September with First Round matches. The Final was held in Seville at Pabellón de San Pablo on 1 May 2016.

Movistar Inter was the defending champion but lost in Quarter-finals to Palma Futsal.

Eventually, ElPozo Murcia won its first ever Copa del Rey title after defeating Palma Futsal 3–2 in the Final.

Calendar

Qualified teams
14 teams of Primera División
10 teams of Segunda División
18 teams of Segunda División B

First round
Draw was held on Tuesday, 8 September. Matches to be played on 22–23 September 2015.

|}

Second round
Draw will take place on 24 September at RFEF headquarters. Draw included ten winners from the first round plus all Primera División and 6 remaining Segunda División teams.

Matches to be played on 29–30 September 2015.

|}

Matches 
All times are CEST except for Canary Islands which are WEST.

Round of 16
Round of 16 draw was held on Friday 2 October at RFEF headquarters. This round draw includes the 16 winners from the Second Round, which in summary are 11 teams from Primera División, 3 from Segunda División and 2 from Segunda División B.

Matches to be played on 13/14 October 2015.

All times are CEST.

|}

Matches

Quarter finals
Quarter-finals draw took place on 16 October 2015, at the RFEF headquarters.

Matches to be played on 27 October 2015.

All times are CET.

|}

Matches

Semifinals
Semi-finals draw took place on 29 October 2015, at the RFEF headquarters.

First leg matches to be played on 4 November 2015 and second leg on 24 February 2016.

All times are CET.

|}

Matches

1st leg

2nd leg

Final
The final will be played on 7 May at the Pabellón San Pablo located in Seville.

See also
2015–16 Primera División de Futsal
2015 Copa de España de Futsal

References

External links
lnfs.es

Copa del Rey de Futsal seasons
Copa
Fut